Tons of Friends is the debut album by Italian electronic duo Crookers. It was released on March 8, 2010 on Southern Fried Records. Many of the songs feature collaborations, including Kid Cudi, Soulwax, Kelis, will.i.am, Róisín Murphy, Miike Snow and many more.

The song "Royal T" featuring Róisín Murphy was featured on Season 7 of So You Think You Can Dance.

Track listing

Italian Version:
"Festa Festa" (feat. Fabri Fibra and Dargen D'Amico)
"Luce" (feat. Samuel Romano)

References

External links 
 Crookers Website
 Tons Of Friends on Itunes UK
 Tons Of Friends at Play.com
 Tons Of Friends on Amazon
 Southern Fried Records Website

2010 albums
Crookers albums
Southern Fried Records albums